This is the list of festivals observed by the followers of the Sikh religion.

Other Sikh festivals
There are some other (around 45) festivals that are celebrated at a much smaller scale with some being centred in particular regions or towns that are not included in the above list. Thoses include Parkash Utsavs (Birth anniversaries of the other 8 Sikh gurus), Gurgadi Divas (passing of guruship), Jyotijot Divas (death anniversaries of other Sikh gurus), Basant Festival of kites which is celebrated in Chheharta Sahib Gurdwara in the village of Wadali where Sri Guru Hargobind Ji was born in 1595, to celebrate the birth and  many other such festivals. All Sikh festival include celebrating by gathering at Gurdwara, paying obeisance to the Guru Granth Sahib and listening to Gurbani, Kirtan and reciting Paath.

However, there are quite a few other local fairs which are historically important to the Sikhs and attract crowds in hundreds of thousands and last two to three days. The most important of these are:

The Martyrdom of both the younger Sahibzadas of Guru Gobind Singh at Fatehgarh Sahib.
The Battle of Chamkaur and the Martyrdom of both elder Sahibzadas of Guru Gobind Singh.
The Martyrdom of the forty followers("Forty Immortals") of Guru Gobind Singh who had previously deserted him, fought bravely against overwhelming Mughal army forces in Muktsar. Guru Gobind Singh blessed them as having achieved liberation. Mela Maghi commemorates this event and an annual fair is held in Sri Muktsar Sahib town.

See also 

 Punjabi festivals
 Punjabi festivals in Pakistan

References

External links

 
Sikh
Lists of religious festivals
Sikh